is a lava dome located in the Daisetsuzan Volcanic Group of the Ishikari Mountains, Hokkaidō, Japan.

Climbing route
The easiest way up the mountain is to use the Daisetsuzan Sōunkyō Kurodake Ropeway up from Sōunkyō. This takes you approximately  up the mountain. You can then use a chairlift to carry you up past the  mark. From there it is a hike with switchbacks the rest of the way to the top. You can also hike the entire route parallel to the ropeway and chairlift from Sōunkyō Onsen. A popular route continues past Mount Kuro, around the Ohachi-Daira caldera, over Mount Asahi and down the Asahidake Ropeway to Asahidake Onsen.

See Also
List of volcanoes in Japan
List of mountains in Japan

References
 Geographical Survey Institute

External links

Mountains of Hokkaido
Volcanoes of Hokkaido
Lava domes

ja:黒岳 (北海道・大雪山)